Dundwa, Dundawa, Dudhwa, Dudwa, Doodwa, etc. refer to:
Dudhwa National Park, a wildlife sanctuary in Lakhimpur Kheri District, Uttar Pradesh state, India
Dudhwa Tiger Reserve, which includes Dudhwa National Park
Dundwa Range, a subrange of the Siwaliks separating Deukhuri Valley of western Nepal from Balrampur and Shravasti districts in Uttar Pradesh
Doodawa Village in Sikar district, Rajasthan, India
Dudhwa Khara, an historic village in Churu district, Rajasthan
Dudawa Town in Shire of Three Springs, Western Australia
Dudhwa railway station, Lakhimpur Kheri district, Uttar Pradesh